Machel may refer to:

Surname
Graça Machel (born 1945), Mozambican politician and humanitarian, the second wife and widow of Samora Machel, third wife and widow of Nelson Mandela
Josina Machel (FRELIMO) (1945–1971), activist for Mozambican independence and the emancipation of African women, the first wife of Samora Machel
Samora Machel (1933–1986), the first president of Mozambique
Stefan Machel (born 1960), Polish rock guitarist, composer, and record producer

Given name
Machel Cedenio (born 1995), Trinidadian Olympic athlete
Machel Millwood (born 1979), Jamaican soccer player
Machel Montano (born 1974), Trinidadian singer, songwriter, and record producer
Machel Waikenda (born 1981), Kenyan politician

See also
Samora Machel constituency, a constituency in the Khomas region of Namibia